Otto Wiegand (29 October 1875 – 11 June 1939) was a German gymnast. He competed in three events at the 1904 Summer Olympics.

References

External links
 

1875 births
1939 deaths
German male artistic gymnasts
Olympic gymnasts of Germany
Athletes (track and field) at the 1904 Summer Olympics
Gymnasts at the 1904 Summer Olympics
Gymnasts at the 1906 Intercalated Games
Gymnasts from Berlin